Thomas Howe may refer to:
 Thomas Marshall Howe (1808–1877), Whig member of the U.S. House of Representatives from Pennsylvania
 Thomas Y. Howe Jr. (1808–1860), U.S. Representative from New York
 Thomas Howe (athlete) (born 1944), Liberian Olympic athlete
 Thomas Carr Howe Jr. (1904–1994),one of the monuments men involved in the recovery of art looted by the Nazis during the Second World War

See also 
 Thomas Howes (disambiguation)